Earth Inferno is a mixed version of three live performances by Fields of the Nephilim which shares its name with a self-published book by occult artist Austin Osman Spare. The live venues used for the recordings were from the group's 1990 Sumerland tour at Wolverhampton Civic Hall (4 August), Brixton Academy (6 October) and Hamburg Sportshalle (6 November). The record was released in April 1991 by Beggars Banquet Records and peaked at number 39 in UK album charts.

Track listing
All tracks by Fields of the Nephilim

Personnel 

Carl McCoy – lead vocals
Tony Pettitt – bass
Paul Wright – lead guitar
Peter Yates – rhythm guitar 
Alexander "Nod" Wright – drums
Paul Chousmer – keyboards

References

External links
 

Fields of the Nephilim albums
1991 live albums
Beggars Banquet Records live albums